The 1976 St. Louis Tennis Classic, also known as the St. Louis WCT, was a men's professional tennis tournament that was part of the Blue Group of the 1976 World Championship Tennis circuit. It was played on indoor carpet courts at the Kiel Auditorium in St. Louis, Missouri in the United States. It was the sixth edition of the tournament and was held from February 17 through February 22, 1976. First-seeded Guillermo Vilas won the singles title and earned $17,000 first-prize money.

Finals

Singles
 Guillermo Vilas defeated  Vijay Amritraj 4–6, 6–0, 6–4
 It was Vilas' 1st singles title of the year and the 14th of his career.

Doubles
 Brian Gottfried /  Raúl Ramírez defeated  John Alexander /  Phil Dent 6–4, 6–2

References

External links
 ITF tournament edition details

Tennis in Missouri
1976 in American tennis